Ferguslie Park is a residential suburb at the north-west extremity of Paisley in Renfrewshire, Scotland. It is bordered by the town of Linwood to the west and Glasgow Airport to the north. Ferguslie Park has history of being among the most deprived communities in Scotland. Attempts have been made at regeneration despite significant challenges.

History
Ferguslie has origins dating back to the sixteenth century, and was the site of a large estate associated with the monks based at Paisley. The modern town, however, was born in the 1850s around an iron-stone mining settlement known as Inkerman. At its closure, the town was demolished and its residents moved to Ferguslie or nearby Elderslie.

Its main form was gained following the Housing Act of 1949.

It was hit particularly hard by the closure of traditional industries particularly based in nearby Linwood in the late-1970s and early-1980s. As a consequence, and also due to its isolated position separated from Paisley and other towns by railway lines and other transport networks; it has suffered a large degree of social exclusion. In particular, it has become known for drug abuse, appearing on a Panorama television programme in the late-1990s relating to the problems this has caused. It has also had severe problems with crime and juvenile delinquency.

Preliminary steps in the regeneration of Ferguslie Park is currently underway. 'Neighbourhood wardens' now patrol the streets to give a visible presence to try to deter crime. Graffiti Squads also aim to remove graffiti from council property within 24 hours to try to reduce the urban decay, with a main focus over recent years on a graffiti artist under the name 'Probs'. However the drug problems and anti-social behaviour still exist, although to a lesser extent than in recent years. The Tannahill Centre, named after the poet Robert Tannahill, a weaver from the town of Paisley, aims to give a nice community centre and shopping area. The centre, however has received criticism from local residents that the fact the chemist is located inside the post office, is often giving drug addicts the heroin substitute Methadone whilst vulnerable pensioners are collecting their pensions. Community projects, such as Ferguslie Park Radio have been successful in helping some youngsters channel their enthusiasm into worthwhile events, and sports facilities exist in the area for five-a-side football.

To the east, new housing has been joined by the commercial development, the Phoenix Centre, which contains a cinema, car dealerships, restaurants, shops and supermarkets, in order to regenerate the former Chrysler car plant that used to be on the site. Whilst regarded as being in Linwood, it is more accurately in Paisley, and joins the Ferguslie Park area; Linwood is in fact further away on the other side of the Johnstone By-Pass.

In 2006, the Scottish Executive named it as one of Scotland's most deprived communities. This information was based on paperwork dating back to 1996. 

To the east, St Mirren F.C., the local team of the town of Paisley who play in the Scottish Premiership, moved in January 2009 from their traditional Love Street home some 600 m away from a new all-seater stadium on vacant ground near the current St. James Station. This involved selling Love Street to a supermarket chain and it was given planning permission by Renfrewshire Council in 2005 for both the new stadium and supermarket plans.

However, in 2012 the "Scottish Index of Multiple Deprivation" analysis by the Scottish Government again identified Ferguslie Park as the most deprived area in Scotland. There was a slight improvement in 2019, with the community the third-most deprived area, almost four decades after the Linwood car manufacturing plant was closed. (The term "deprivation" refers not only to low income according to the BBC, but may also include "fewer resources and opportunities, for example in health and education".) A BBC report states that the most significant problem for the Council was the "half-abandoned Tannahill scheme", an area with derelict homes, but regeneration funding of £6m had already been scheduled; it would be used to build just over a hundred affordable houses.

Location and transport
Ferguslie Park is at the north-west extremity of Paisley in Renfrewshire, Scotland. It is bordered by the town of Linwood to the west and Glasgow Airport to the north. To the North the Inverclyde-to-Glasgow Railway line separates the residential area from the industrial areas to the North East of Ferguslie Park. Paisley St James railway station, is located on the line near Greenhill Road, however the scale of the urban decay is evident on the station with its high security, only one train per hour calls, and many flats that were near the station no longer exist. The Glasgow Airport Rail Link will see the current station close and move closer to the centre of Ferguslie Park, as the rail link to the airport will require a junction where the station is located.

St James's Park, known locally as the Racecourse, a recreation ground to the south of the M8, is a popular football venue for amateur teams. This area has avoided many of the problems of Ferguslie Park and is still fairly well used, with many businesses, in particular long stay car parks for the nearby airport.

2 bus services run through the area, one links the area to the Phoenix Centre and Paisley Town Centre, and the other by transport giant Arriva, links the area with Paisley Cross. An indicator of the crime level, no company operates past 18:30, despite the low car use.

Notable people

 Joe Egan and Gerry Rafferty (singer/songwriters) of the band Stealers Wheel. In 1974 Stealers Wheel, whose joint founders Gerry Rafferty and Joe Egan were both from Paisley, named their second album after the estate.
 Kelly Marie (singer/songwriter)
 John Byrne (artist and playwright)
 Sandra Osborne (politician and former MP for Ayr Carrick & Cumnock)
 John Keenan (Roman Catholic Bishop of Paisley)

References

External links
 Glencoats House web page

Areas in Paisley, Renfrewshire
Housing estates in Scotland